Arthur Simmons (13 November 1909 – 28 February 1990) was an Australian cricketer. He played two first-class matches for New South Wales in 1934/35.

See also
 List of New South Wales representative cricketers

References

External links
 

1909 births
1990 deaths
Australian cricketers
New South Wales cricketers
Cricketers from Sydney